Henry Ernest Gee (born 24 April 1962 in London, England) is a British paleontologist, evolutionary biologist and senior editor of the scientific journal Nature.

Early life and education
Gee attended Sevenoaks School as a boarder. He then attended the Michael Hall School. He earned a Bachelor of Science degree at the University of Leeds and completed his PhD at the University of Cambridge in 1990 as a postgraduate student of Fitzwilliam College, Cambridge. His doctoral research investigated the evolution of bison in Britain in the Ice Age.

Career
Gee joined Nature as a reporter in 1987 and is now Senior Editor, Biological Sciences. He has published a number of books, including In Search of Deep Time (1999), A Field Guide to Dinosaurs (illustrated by Luis Rey) (2003) and Jacob's Ladder (2004).

The Accidental Species, a book on human evolution, was published by the University of Chicago Press in October 2013. According to Stephen Cave (author of Immortality: The Quest to Live Forever and How It Drives Civilisation), Gee writes, "persuasively," that "our obsession with our uniqueness is folly....  We... believe we are so exceptional... that we are the pinnacle of evolution. But this is a misunderstanding: we are just one twig in the thicket, and we could easily have never sprouted at all."

In addition to his professional activities, Gee is a blues musician and a Tolkienist. He was the editor of Mallorn, the journal of the Tolkien Society, for nine issues (2008–13). His science fiction trilogy The Sigil, previously available in draft form online, was published by ReAnimus Press in August and September 2012.

On 17 January 2014, Gee revealed the identity of pseudonymous science blogger, Dr. Isis on Twitter. Dr. Isis was an open critic of the scientific journal Nature, where Gee is a senior editor. Nature released a statement on the matter.

His book, A (Very) Short History of Life on Earth, won the 2022 Royal Society Science Books Prize.

Personal life 
Residence is in Cromer.

Books
Gee's publications include:
 1996: Before the Backbone: Views on the Origin of the Vertebrates New York: Springer Science+Business Media. . .
 1999: In Search of Deep Time: Beyond the Fossil Record to a New History of Life. Sacramento: Comstock Publishing. Hardcover: .  Paperback: .
 2001: (second edition) Deep Time: Cladistics, the Revolution in Evolution.  .
 2003: A Field Guide To Dinosaurs: The Essential Handbook For Travelers in the Mesozoic.  Illustrations by Luis Rey.  Hauppage: Barron's Educational Series.  .
 2004: Jacob's Ladder: The History of the Human Genome.  New York: W. W. Norton & Company. .
 2004: The Science of Middle-Earth: Explaining The Science Behind The Greatest Fantasy Epic Ever Told! Cold Spring Harbor: Cold Spring Harbor Laboratory Press.  2004 hardcover: .  2005 paperback:  . (Reviewed in The Guardian)
 2008:  (ed.)  Futures from Nature.  New York: Tor Books.  .
 2013:  The Accidental Species: MISUNDERSTANDINGS OF HUMAN EVOLUTION  Chicago: University of Chicago Press.  . (Reviewed in The Daily Telegraph)
 2014:  (ed. with Colin Sullivan)  Nature Futures 2.  New York: Tor Books.  .
 2017: Across the Bridge: Understanding the Origin of the Vertebrates Chicago: University of Chicago Press. 
 2021: A (Very) Short History of Life on Earth: 4.6 Billion Years in 12 Pithy Chapters Pan Macmillan.

References

External links 
 Henry Gee. The End Of The Pier Show - Occam's Typewriter
 Henry Gee. averyshorthistoryoflifeonearth.blogspot.com

1962 births
Academic journal editors
Alumni of Fitzwilliam College, Cambridge
Alumni of the University of Leeds
British evolutionary biologists
English palaeontologists
English science writers
English science fiction writers
Living people
Science fiction editors
English male novelists
British speculative fiction editors
English male non-fiction writers